The Men's omnium at the European Track Championships was first competed in 2010. Prior to 2010, there were two elite omniums held annually: an endurance omnium and a sprint omnium.

The Omnium consists of six different competitions over two days.

Medalists

Older events 
Before 2010, European championships Omnium events were held as European Criterion or Winter Championship (1956–1971).

From 1972 to 1990 they were organized by the FICP as European Championship. Since 1995 the UEC is responsible for all European championships.

References

External links 
2010 Results
2011 Results
2012 Results
Results from cyclingarchives.com

 
Men's omnium
Men's omnium